Antony Ponzini (June 1, 1933 – December 30, 2002) was an American actor.  Some of Ponzini's credits include roles on soap operas The Edge of Night, Another World, and being a member of the original cast of One Life to Live as Vince Wolek, the latter of which lasted from 1968 through 1975. Throughout the 1970s, 1980s, and 1990s, Ponzini became a familiar face on television with numerous guest appearances on some of that era's most popular TV shows (including: Kojak, The Jeffersons, The Bionic Woman, Starsky and Hutch, Hawaii Five-O, The Rockford Files, Lou Grant, Three's Company, Cagney & Lacey, Hill Street Blues, St. Elsewhere, The Love Boat, Falcon Crest, Hardcastle and McCormick, Knight Rider, Remington Steele, Who's the Boss?, Hunter, Columbo, Baywatch, Murphy Brown, Murder, She Wrote). Quite often he was cast as a "thug", "crime boss", or "tough cop."  From 1989 to 1991, Ponzini played "Capt. Corelli", a recurring character (54 episodes) on the daytime soap opera Generations.  He also appeared in Friday the 13th Part 4 as Vincent. In 1993, in one of Ponzini's most memorable roles, he played Enzo, the title role, in the Seinfeld episode The Barber.

Filmography

Film

Television

References

External links

1933 births
2002 deaths
People from Brooklyn
Male actors from New York City
American people of Italian descent
American male film actors
American male television actors
American male soap opera actors
20th-century American male actors